After Many Days is a 1919 British silent drama film directed by Sidney Morgan and starring Bruce Gordon, Alice Russon and Irene Browne. In the film, a girl believes that her father has had an illegitimate child with an artist's model, but discovers that it was his criminal brother.

Cast
 Bruce Gordon as Paul Irving  
 Alice Russon as Marion Bramleyn  
 Irene Browne as Connie  
 Adeline Hayden Coffin as Mrs. Irving

References

Bibliography
 Low, Rachael. The History of the British Film 1918-1929. George Allen & Unwin, 1971.

External links
 

1919 films
British drama films
British silent feature films
1910s English-language films
Films directed by Sidney Morgan
1919 drama films
British black-and-white films
1910s British films
Silent drama films